George Albert Stone III (born May 11, 1994), known professionally as EST Gee, is an American rapper. He is signed to Yo Gotti's Collective Music Group (CMG), Interscope Records and Warlike. His fifth mixtape, Bigger Than Life or Death, released on July 21, 2021, and peaked at number 7 on the Billboard 200. It spawned the Billboard Hot 100-charting songs "Lick Back" and "5500 Degrees". A deluxe edition of the mixtape was released on December 3, 2021.

Early life 
George Albert Stone III was born on May 11, 1994, in Louisville, Kentucky to George and Sheila Stone. He grew up in the now demolished Clarksdale Projects before moving to Tubman Court & Ellington Avenue in the southeastern region of the city. After graduating St. Xavier High School in 2012, Stone received a football scholarship to Indiana State University and majored in communications. He spent two years there before transferring to Sac City College. After just a year he transferred again to Stephen F. Austin University. Stone dropped out of college in 2016. He was arrested for drug trafficking in the same year and was sentenced to four months of house arrest.

During 2017, he was briefly on the CFL team the Winnipeg Blue Bombers.

Career 
During his house arrest, Stone became motivated to pursue a rap career after watching rapper and future collaborator Lil Baby perform on TV. He initially adopted the name "Big Gee" before switching to "EST Gee", in which EST is an initialism for "Everybody Shines Together". He released his debut song "Stains" as "Big Gee" on YouTube on December 17, 2017. He continued to release consistently through YouTube, gaining himself a local fanbase. He released his first and second mixtapes El Toro and Die Bloody in June and August 2019, respectively.

EST Gee gained mainstream attention with his third mixtape Ion Feel Nun on March 6, 2020, following it up with his fourth mixtape I Still Don't Feel Nun on December 18, 2020. In January 2021, EST Gee signed a deal with Yo Gotti's Collective Music Group (CMG), Interscope Records and Warlike. He featured on Lil Baby's single "Real as It Gets", which became his first Billboard Hot 100 song, peaking at number 34. His fifth mixtape Bigger Than Life or Death was released on July 21, 2021. It features guest appearances from Future, Young Thug, Pooh Shiesty, Lil Durk, and more. He explained the meaning of the project to Audiomack: "It's just telling you what's going on. And what I got going on right now is bigger than life or death. Can't nothing affect me or stop me. Even if I die, that ain't gonna do nothing but make me bigger. I'm not dying until I make a hundred million, make that two hundred million". The mixtape debuted at number 7 on the Billboard 200 with roughly 30,000 units. It was followed by the release of a deluxe edition, Bigger Than Life or Death, Pt. 2, on December 3, 2021, containing no features.

Personal life
EST Gee's mother died in March 2020 due to leukemia and his brother died a week later in a shooting in Louisville.

EST Gee was shot five times in September 2019 following a music video shoot, getting hit in the stomach four times and once on his left eye. His brother was hit in the leg. They were transported to a hospital and Gee was discharged after two weeks. Following surgery, Gee has retained most vision in his eye.

Discography

Studio albums

Compilation albums

Mixtapes

Singles

As lead artist

As featured artist

Other charted songs

Notes

References 

Living people
1994 births
Interscope Records artists
21st-century American male musicians
21st-century American rappers
Rappers from Kentucky
Musicians from Louisville, Kentucky
African-American male rappers
Trap musicians
21st-century African-American musicians
Southern hip hop musicians